Jatiya Samata Samaj is a Nepalese Dalit movement, linked to Rastriya Janamorcha. Rajesh B.K. is the president of the organisation.

References

Dalit wings of political parties in Nepal